Al-Qasim ibn Idris was an Idrisid prince and ruler in parts of Morocco during the 9th century.

Life
Al-Qasim was a younger son of the second Idrisid ruler of Morocco, Idris II. Upon the death of Idris II, al-Qasim's oldest brother Muhammad succeeded to the throne, but divided much of the country among his younger brothers. Thus al-Qasim received rule over Tangier and Basra in the north. 

When another brother, Isa, rose in revolt, al-Qasim refused to support Muhammad, and was attacked and deprived of his domains by another brother, Umar. Al-Qasim outlived his brother and the latter's sons, and in the reign of his great-nephew, Yahya II, his family received governance of the western half of the Idrisid capital, Fes, along with the eastern frontier provinces of the Berber tribes of Luwata and Kutama.

Towards the end of the 9th century, the family of al-Qasim remained in control of northern Morocco (Tangier, Basra, Ceuta), and his son, Yahya III, ruled over Fes for a while after evicting the Kharijite rebel Abd al-Razzaq from the city. The last Idrisid rulers all descended from al-Qasim via his son Muhammad.

Genealogy

References

Sources
 
 

Idrisid dynasty
People from Fez, Morocco
9th-century monarchs in Africa
9th-century Moroccan people
Year of birth unknown
9th-century Arabs